This is a list of recordings by American rhythm and blues and rock 'n' roll performer and songwriter Fats Domino.

Studio recordings

Over 350 studio recordings by Fats Domino have been released in total. Some of them were the same recordings, but released under different titles, while some other recordings had the same title, but were in fact completely different songs. Certain songs have been recorded at different sessions, often in significantly different style, and are identified as different versions.

Recording sessions

Fats Domino: vocals and piano, unless instrumentals (piano only), marked by (instr.) after title and otherwise stated.

Imperial

Fats Domino was signed to the Imperial Records label in 1949 and left it in early 1963, when the label was sold to Liberty Records. However, dozens of his recordings for Imperial have been overdubbed with female vocal chorus from May to July 1963 and next released by Liberty. Complete Imperial recordings have been released in 1993 on 8-CD box Out of New Orleans.

ABC-Paramount

Fats Domino recorded at ABC-Paramount from April 1963 to February 1965. Complete ABC-Paramount recordings have been released in 1996 on 3-CD box The Fat Man.

Mercury

Fats Domino recorded for Mercury Records in June 1965. Only two singles have been released by this label.

Broadmoor

Domino recorded at Broadmoor Records in September 1967. Only two singles have been released by this label. Later these recordings were sold to Reprise Records which released them in 1971 as LP album Fats.

Reprise

Domino recorded at Reprise Records from May 1968 to June 1970. These recordings have been released on many singles and on LP album Fats Is Back (1968). Complete Broadmoor and Reprise recordings have been released in 2005 on CD compilation Sweet Patootie.

Various labels

Alphabetical list of studio recordings

The table below lists in alphabetical order all studio recordings by Fats Domino (including unreleased recordings and alternative titles), together with references to the songwriters, recording dates and the first release of each recording. Alternative takes, mono and stereo recordings, edited and overdubbed recordings are listed separately. Take numbers are given for those cases when they could be properly attributed.

The table also includes recordings issued only on unofficial (bootleg) releases.

Title

The most common title of a recording (usually used in album) is chosen as its main title, presented in bold italics in the column "Title". Alternate (or shortened, or erroneous) titles of such recording are given in italics in the same column and with reference to the main title, without any additional attributes. All attributes of a recording (column "Attr.") are given only with respect to its main title.

Instrumental compositions are marked "instr." in parentheses after the title.

Recordings, which have been attributed in some releases to Fats Domino but which had been in fact made without his participation (e.g., by Fats Domino band) are listed in italics with appropriate explanations.

Version

 Different songs
Some titles of Fats Domino recordings actually refer each to two or even three different songs. These recordings are labeled in the column "Version" by Roman numerals as Song I, Song II and Song III in chronological order of recording.
 Different versions
Some songs were recorded in different sessions. These recordings are labeled in the column "Version" as Version 1 and Version 2 in chronological order of recording.
 Different takes
The cases when the take numbers are known are quite rare. Usually distinctive takes are shown as follows: when a take is released on a single and/or album, it is a master take (Master in the column "Version"), otherwise it is an alternate take (Alternate).

Single and album masters can be different, in these cases the words Single and Album are added respectively before the word "master".

When the take number is known, it is added in the column "Version" for information, such as Take #.

Attributes

 Mono and stereo
All listed recordings have attribute "Stereo" (s) or "Mono" (m). When a recording was released in both forms, it is listed twice, both as mono and as stereo.
 Electronically re-recorded for simulate stereo: Liberty albums

Though Fats Domino recorded at Imperial about 70 titles in stereo, only two his Imperial albums (24 tracks in total) have been released in stereo (simultaneously with their mono versions): ...A Lot of Dominos! (Imperial LP-12066, 1960) and Let the Four Winds Blow (Imperial LP-12073, 1961). All other originally issued stereo recordings were released by Imperial as mono mixes, together with original mono recordings on the same mono LP albums.

The label Imperial was sold to Liberty Records, Inc. in 1964. Liberty was purchased by United Artists in 1968. All mono Imperial albums and compilations by Fats Domino were reissued in late 1960s under label Imperial with the mention of Liberty, labelled as "Stereo" and with the notification "Electronically re-recorded for simulate stereo" (or similar) on back cover, such as first album Rock and Rollin' with Fats Domino (Imperial LP-12387, 1969) originally issued in 1956.

Unfortunately, even the stereo recordings (previously released by Imperial as mono mixes on mono albums) are present on these Liberty albums as mono mixes, electronically re-recorded for simulate stereo, and not as true stereo recordings (what could the buyer hope for, after reading the inscription "Stereo" on labels).

These "electronically created stereo" recordings are not reviewed in this article, as they have no additional sound material as compared to the original mono recording and were always issued after the release of each respective mono variant.
 Stereo remixes

Imperial has released two stereo albums without any remixing, just as this sound was recorded (generally vocals and piano appearing in one channel, and other instruments in the other).

Subsequently on most compilations these recordings were remixed for release. Thus, both boxes by Bear Family, released with an interval of 26 years but almost identical in terms of Imperial material (except for a few entries having "restored speed", which will be discussed below) include all stereo recordings not in their original format, but as remixes. Sometimes these remixes are almost indistinguishable from mono recording (such as Magic Isles) or are undeniably mono recording (such as Your Cheating Heart). Unfortunately, most of compilers avoid mentioning whether the recordings they include are original stereo, or stereo remixes or mono, and they avoid mentioning the word "stereo" in their booklets at all, so the analysis has to be done exclusively by listening.

The stereo remixes are listed here with attribute "Remix" (r) in the column "Attr." only if they were released before the original (not remixed) stereo recordings.
 Edits

Some recordings were edited for release (for single or album). The edited recordings are listed separately with attribute "Edited" (ed), except for compilations, where they are not considered.
 Composite tracks

Some released tracks (including masters) were made from the original recording by duplicating part of it and then splicing. Such tracks are called composite (cm).
 Overdubs
Some recordings were overdubbed for release (by chorus, or by instruments, or by hand claps, or by factitious audience noise for simulate live recording). The overdubbed recordings are listed separately with one of attributes: by chorus (oc), by drums (od), by hand claps (oh), by some instruments (oi), by public noise (op), by saxophone (ox), by strings (os).

When a recording has more than one attribute, they are listed with a hyphen, e.g., s-ed-oc-os.
 Restored speed (key)

Often a recording was speeded-up for release, and some compilers claim that in their release it was restored to its original performance key and speed.

Unfortunately, these statements are difficult to verify, and there are also great doubts about this issue in relation to other entries, so these versions are not listed here.

First release

Usually, both single (as label and catalog number) and album (as title in italics) are listed, following by the year of release.

Some recordings have been released only on compilations. In these cases, compilation is listed as album (title in italics, year of release).

First releases of the same version with different attributes are listed in chronological order of release.

Live recordings

Preliminary observation
Unlike studio recordings, live recordings are rarely accompanied by related information in the releases. In many cases it was necessary to ascertain whether a recording was indeed part of the particular concert referred to in the particular release. This has been done by way of checking real concert tracklists (this information is scattered across numerous sources, both printed and online) and comparing them to the tracks listed in the releases, as well as by actually listening to recordings and comparing them. Here is the result of this research work.

Some so-called "concerts" referred to in the releases actually included material from two or more shows, separated by several hours or even days. For any song that had been performed and/or included twice (or more) within the same "concert", the notes "Show 1", "Show 2" etc. are added right after the date and venue. This does not reflect the actual order of any such shows (which is not really possible), but is merely a way to distinguish them.

Only live recordings published on vinyl records and CDs, including bootlegs, are listed. Cassettes VHS, DVDs and other similar sources are not included in the list.

The attributes of such live recordings are similar to those of studio recordings.

Alphabetical list of live recordings

Notes

References 

Lists of songs recorded by American artists